Dahlia Sin (born May 13, c. 1991) is an American drag performer most known for competing on the twelfth season of RuPaul's Drag Race. She is a "drag daughter" of fellow Drag Race contestant Aja and a member of the Haus of Aja. Season 13 contestant Kandy Muse is a "drag sister".

Career
Dahlia Sin competed on the twelfth season of RuPaul's Drag Race. She was the first contestant to be eliminated.

Personal life
Dahlia Sin is originally from Los Angeles and lives in New York City. She has described herself as a "tattooed beauty doll", and was previously a club kid and sex worker.

References

External links
 

Living people
American drag queens
American sex workers
LGBT people from California
LGBT people from New York (state)
People from Los Angeles
People from New York City
Dahlia Sin
Year of birth missing (living people)